Mont-Bernanchon is a commune in the Pas-de-Calais department in the Hauts-de-France region of France.

Geography
Both the river Clarence and the Canal d’Aire flow by the commune, which covers a large area of forests and lakes.

Population

Places of interest
 The church of St.Nicaise, dating from the seventeenth century.
 The Commonwealth War Graves Commission cemeteries.

See also
Communes of the Pas-de-Calais department

References

External links

 The CWGC cemetery
 The CWGC graves in the churchyard

Montbernanchon